A Good Friend Is Nice is the debut studio album by American pop-rap duo Jack & Jack. It was released on January 25, 2019 via Island Records, a subsidiary of Universal Music. The album was supported by an accompanying tour named Good Friends Are Nice.

Background 
The duo shared on their Instagram pages the album cover, a photo of them from their time in kindergarten, featuring the handwriting of five-year-old Johnson and the date 1-11-02.

Singles 
The album's lead single "No One Compares to You" was released on October 5, 2018. Jonas Blue's single "Rise" (which features the duo) is also included.
The following single from A Good Friend Is Nice, "Tension", was released on January 11, 2019.

Track listing 
Track listing adapted from iTunes.
Credits adapted from Tidal.

Charts

References 

2019 debut albums
Jack & Jack albums
Island Records albums
Albums produced by TMS (production team)